Mumbai Central–New Delhi AC Suvidha Special Express was a Superfast Express train of the Suvidha Express category belonging to Western Railway zone that ran between  and  in India. It operated as train number 22913 from Mumbai Central to New Delhi and as train number 22914 in the reverse direction, serving the states of Maharashtra & Delhi. It was one of the fastest train on Mumbai-Delhi Sector, at its maximum speed of 125 - 130 KMPH

As of 1 July 2015, this train service has been discontinued.

Coaches
The 22913 / 14 Mumbai Central–New Delhi AC Suvidha Special Express had 5 AC 2 tier, 8 AC 3 tier & 2 End on Generator coaches. In addition, it carried a pantry car & the final fare was inclusive of catering charges.

Service
The 22913 Mumbai Central–New Delhi AC Suvidha Special Express covered the distance of 1384 kilometres in 15 hours 55 mins (86.95 km/hr) & in 16 hours 05 mins as 22914 New Delhi–Mumbai Central AC Suvidha Special Express (86.05 km/hr).

As the average speed of the train was above , as per Indian Railways rules, its fare included a Superfast surcharge.

Routeing and technical halts
The 22913 / 14 Mumbai Central–New Delhi AC Suvidha Special Express ran from Mumbai Central with technical halts at & via ,  to New Delhi.

Traction
As the entire route is fully electrified, a Vadodara or Ghaziabad-based WAP-5 or WAP-7 powered the train for its entire journey.

Timings

22913 Mumbai Central–New Delhi AC Suvidha Special Express left Mumbai Central every Wednesday, Friday & Sunday at 16:00 hrs IST and reached New Delhi at 07:55 hrs IST the next day.
22914 New Delhi–Mumbai Central AC Suvidha Special Express left New Delhi every Monday, Thursday & Saturday at 14:50 hrs IST and reached Mumbai Central at 06:55 hrs IST the next day.

See also
Dedicated Intercity trains of India
Rajdhani Express

References

External links

Irctc.co.in
Wr.indianrailways.gov.in
Pib.nic.in
Dnaindia.com

Delhi–Mumbai trains
Rail transport in Gujarat
Rail transport in Rajasthan
Rail transport in Delhi
Suvidha Express trains
Railway services introduced in 2014
Railway services discontinued in 2015